Casian Vasile Miclăuș (born 14 August 1977) is a Romanian former footballer who played as a left back.

Career
Miclăuş began football at his hometown team Gaz Metan Mediaș, making his senior debut in the Romanian second league in the 1995–96 Divizia B season. He later made his debut in the Romanian first league at Universitatea Craiova in the 1998–99 Divizia A season. Miclăuş played 4 games in CFR Cluj's 2005 Intertoto Cup campaign in which the club reached the final.

Honours
CFR Cluj
UEFA Intertoto Cup runner-up: 2005

References

External links
 
 

1977 births
Living people
People from Mediaș
Romanian footballers
Association football defenders
Liga I players
Liga II players
CS Gaz Metan Mediaș players
FC U Craiova 1948 players
ACF Gloria Bistrița players
FC Brașov (1936) players
CFR Cluj players
CS Mioveni players
ASA 2013 Târgu Mureș players